Yenapayevo is a rural locality (a selo) and the administrative center of Yenapayevskoye Rural Settlement, Oktyabrsky District, Perm Krai, Russia. The population was 760 as of 2010. There are 7 streets.

Geography 
Yenapayevo is located 26 km northwest of Oktyabrsky (the district's administrative centre) by road. Budkeyevo is the nearest rural locality.

References 

Rural localities in Perm Krai